The 2005 FIA WTCC Race of Italy was the opening round of the 2005 World Touring Car Championship season, the first season of the revived World Touring Car Championship, after a previous season in 1987. It was held at the Autodromo Nazionale di Monza at Monza in Italy on April 10, 2005. BMW and Alfa Romeo took one victory each, Dirk Müller winning Race 1 for the former, and James Thompson winning Race 2.

Report

Qualifying
Dirk Müller took pole position for the first World Touring Car Championship race by topping the timesheets in the qualifying session with a time of 1:59.009. Two other BMWs had finished behind him, fellow BMW Team Deutschland driver Jörg Müller, and the BMW Team Italy-Spain car of Antonio García. However, Jörg had his best time disallowed by the stewards after he failed to stop at the weighing scales, dropping him to 18th. Alfa Romeo Racing Team drivers Gabriele Tarquini and Augusto Farfus qualified in third and fourth place, with reigning European Touring Car Champion Andy Priaulx fifth for BMW Team UK. The session was brought to a premature end after Alain Menu crashed his Chevrolet Lacetti, bringing out the red flags.

Race 1
Dirk Müller led the first race of the new FIA World Touring Car Championship from pole position to take the victory. Behind him, Gabriele Tarquini finished second, with his Alfa Romeo teammate Augusto Farfus finishing third after managing to keep Andy Priaulx at bay. Antonio García slipped back from his front row starting position to finish fifth after he had been nudged off the track by Farfus during an overtaking manoeuvre. The remaining Alfa Romeo drivers, Fabrizio Giovanardi and James Thompson, finished in sixth and seventh position, with SEAT Sport's Rickard Rydell taking the last point in eighth as well as pole position for Race 2, for which the top eight finishers from the first race are reversed on the race two grid. Marc Hennerici finished 13th overall to take the victory in the Independent's Trophy.

Race 2
Polesitter Rydell was passed by Thompson for the lead at the start of the second race. Meanwhile, Giovanardi stalled on the second row of the grid. García and Dirk Müller were able to pass Rydell for second and third and began chasing Thompson for the lead, but García made a mistake and lost three positions to Müller, Farfus and Tarquini. On the sixth lap, Farfus ran wide at the first chicane, while Müller and Tarquini clashed, putting the Italian out of the race. This allowed García to regain third behind Dirk Müller. Thompson crossed the line to win the race ahead of Dirk Müller and García. Jörg Müller recovered from 29th on the grid to finish in fourth, with Jordi Gené, Alessandro Zanardi and Giovanardi rounding out the points. Hennerici won the Independent's Trophy after finishing tenth.

Classification

Race 1

Race 2

Standings after the races

Drivers' Championship standings

Manufacturers' Championship standings

 Note: Only the top five positions are included for the drivers standings.

References

External links
 Results booklet from fiawtcc.com archives

Italy
WTCC